Marius Barnard (born 20 January 1969) is a retired South African tennis player. As a professional, he was rather successful in doubles competitions. In his career, he won three titles on the ATP Tour.

Career finals

Doubles: 3 titles

References

External links
 
 

1969 births
Living people
Afrikaner people
Sportspeople from Cape Town
South African male tennis players